Earth science or geoscience includes all fields of natural science related to the planet Earth. This is a branch of science dealing with the physical, chemical, and biological complex constitutions and synergistic linkages of Earth's four spheres: the biosphere, hydrosphere, atmosphere, and geosphere (or lithosphere). Earth science can be considered to be a branch of planetary science, but with a much older history.

There are reductionist and holistic approaches to Earth sciences. It is also the study of Earth and its neighbors in space. Some Earth scientists use their knowledge of the planet to locate and develop energy and mineral resources. Others study the impact of human activity on Earth's environment, and design methods to protect the planet. Some use their knowledge about Earth processes such as volcanoes, earthquakes, and hurricanes to help protect people from these dangerous events.

Earth sciences can include the study of geology, the lithosphere, and the large-scale structure of Earth's interior, as well as the atmosphere, hydrosphere, and biosphere. Typically, Earth scientists use tools from geology, chronology, physics, chemistry, geography, biology, and mathematics to build a quantitative understanding of how Earth works and evolves. For example, meteorologists study the weather and watch for dangerous storms. Hydrologists examine water and warn of floods. Seismologists study earthquakes and try to understand where they will strike. Geologists study rocks and help to locate useful minerals. Earth scientists often work in the field—perhaps climbing mountains, exploring the seabed, crawling through caves, or wading in swamps. They measure and collect samples (such as rocks or river water), then record their findings on charts and maps.

Geology 

Geology is the study of the lithosphere, or Earth's surface, including the crust and rocks. It includes the physical characteristics and processes that occur in the lithosphere as well as how they are affected by geothermal energy. It incorporates aspects of chemistry, physics, and biology as elements of geology interact. Historical geology is the application of geology to interpret Earth history and how it has changed over time. Geochemistry studies the chemical components and processes of the Earth. Geophysics studies the physical properties of the lithosphere. Paleontology studies fossilized biological material in the lithosphere. Planetary geology studies geology as it pertains to extraterrestrial bodies. Geomorphology studies the origin of landscapes. Structural geology studies the deformation of rocks to produce mountains and lowlands. Resource geology studies how energy resources can be obtained from minerals. Environmental geology studies how pollution and contaminates affect soil and rock. Mineralogy is the study of minerals. It includes the study of mineral formation, crystal structure, hazards associated with minerals, and the physical and chemical properties of minerals. Petrology is the study of rocks, including the formation and composition of rocks. Petrography is a branch of petrology that studies the typology and classification of rocks.

Earth's interior 

Plate tectonics, mountain ranges, volcanoes, and earthquakes are geological phenomena that can be explained in terms of physical and chemical processes in the Earth's crust. Beneath the Earth's crust lies the mantle which is heated by the radioactive decay of heavy elements. The mantle is not quite solid and consists of magma which is in a state of semi-perpetual convection. This convection process causes the lithospheric plates to move, albeit slowly. The resulting process is known as plate tectonics. Areas of the crust where new crust is created are called divergent boundaries, those where it is brought back into the Earth are convergent boundaries and those where plates slide past each other, but no new lithospheric material is created or destroyed, are referred to as transform (or conservative) boundaries Earthquakes result from the movement of the lithospheric plates, and they often occur near convergent boundaries where parts of the crust are forced into the earth as part of subduction.

Plate tectonics might be thought of as the process by which the Earth is resurfaced. As the result of seafloor spreading, new crust and lithosphere is created by the flow of magma from the mantle to the near surface, through fissures, where it cools and solidifies. Through  subduction, oceanic crust and lithosphere returns to the convecting mantle. Volcanoes result primarily from the melting of subducted crust material. Crust material that is forced into the asthenosphere melts, and some portion of the melted material becomes light enough to rise to the surface—giving birth to volcanoes.

Atmospheric science 

Atmospheric science initially developed in the late-19th century as a means to forecast the weather through meteorology, the study of weather. Atmospheric chemistry was developed in the 20th century to measure air pollution and expanded in the 1970s in response to acid rain. Climatology studies the climate and climate change.

The troposphere, stratosphere, mesosphere, thermosphere, and exosphere are the five layers which make up Earth's atmosphere. 75% of the mass in the atmosphere is located within the troposphere, the lowest layer. In all, the atmosphere is made up of about 78.0% nitrogen, 20.9% oxygen, and 0.92% argon, and small amounts of other gases including CO2 and water vapor. Water vapor and CO2 cause the Earth's atmosphere to catch and hold the Sun's energy through the greenhouse effect. This makes Earth's surface warm enough for liquid water and life. In addition to trapping heat, the atmosphere also protects living organisms by shielding the Earth's surface from cosmic rays. The magnetic field—created by the internal motions of the core—produces the magnetosphere which protects Earth's atmosphere from the solar wind. As the Earth is 4.5 billion years old, it would have lost its atmosphere by now if there were no protective magnetosphere.

Earth's magnetic field

Hydrology 

Hydrology is the study of the hydrosphere and the movement of water on Earth. It emphasizes the study of how humans use and interact with freshwater supplies. Study of water's movement is closely related to geomorphology and other branches of Earth science. Applied hydrology involves engineering to maintain aquatic environments and distribute water supplies. Subdisciplines of hydrology include oceanography, hydrogeology, ecohydrology, and glaciology. Oceanography is the study of oceans. Hydrogeology is the study of groundwater. It includes the mapping of groundwater supplies and the analysis of groundwater contaminants. Applied hydrogeology seeks to prevent contamination of groundwater and mineral springs and make it available as drinking water. The earliest exploitation of groundwater resources dates back to 3000 BC, and hydrogeology as a science was developed by hydrologists beginning in the 17th century. Ecohydrology is the study of ecological systems in the hydrosphere. It can be divided into the physical study of aquatic ecosystems and the biological study of aquatic organisms. Ecohydrology includes the effects that organisms and aquatic ecosystems have on one another as well as how these ecoystems are affected by humans. Glaciology is the study of the cryosphere, including glaciers and coverage of the Earth by ice and snow. Concerns of glaciology include access to glacial freshwater, mitigation of glacial hazards, obtaining resources that exist beneath frozen land, and addressing the effects of climate change on the cryosphere.

Ecology 

Ecology is the study of the biosphere. This includes the study of nature and of how living things interact with the Earth and one another. It considers how living things use resources such as oxygen, water, and nutrients from the Earth to sustain themselves. It also considers how humans and other living creatures cause changes to nature.

Physical geography 

Physical geography is the study of Earth's systems and how they interact with one another as part of a single self-contained system. It incorporates astronomy, mathematical geography, meteorology, climatology, geology, geomorphology, biology, biogeography, pedology, and soils geography. Physical geography is distinct from human geography, which studies the human populations on Earth, though it does include human effects on the environment.

Methodology 

Methodologies vary depending on the nature of the subjects being studied. Studies typically fall into one of three categories: observational, experimental, or theoretical. Earth scientists often conduct sophisticated computer analysis or visit an interesting location to study earth phenomena (e.g. Antarctica or hot spot island chains).

A foundational idea in Earth science is the notion of uniformitarianism, which states that "ancient geologic features are interpreted by understanding active processes that are readily observed." In other words, any geologic processes at work in the present have operated in the same ways throughout geologic time. This enables those who study Earth history to apply knowledge of how the Earth's processes operate in the present to gain insight into how the planet has evolved and changed throughout long history.

Earth's spheres 

Earth science generally recognizes four spheres, the lithosphere, the hydrosphere, the atmosphere, and the biosphere; these correspond to rocks, water, air and life. Also included by some are the cryosphere (corresponding to ice) as a distinct portion of the hydrosphere and the pedosphere (corresponding to soil) as an active and intermixed sphere.
The following fields of science are generally categorized within the Earth sciences:
 Geology describes the rocky parts of the Earth's crust (or lithosphere) and its historic development. Major subdisciplines are mineralogy and petrology, geomorphology, paleontology, stratigraphy, structural geology, engineering geology, and sedimentology.
Physical geography focuses on geography as an Earth science. Physical geography is the study of Earth's seasons, climate, atmosphere, soil, streams, landforms, and oceans. Physical geography can be divided into several branches or related fields, as follows: geomorphology, biogeography, environmental geography, palaeogeography, climatology, meteorology, coastal geography, hydrology, ecology, glaciology. 
Geophysics and geodesy investigate the shape of the Earth, its reaction to forces and its magnetic and gravity fields. Geophysicists explore the Earth's core and mantle as well as the tectonic and seismic activity of the lithosphere. Geophysics is commonly used to supplement the work of geologists in developing a comprehensive understanding of crustal geology, particularly in mineral and petroleum exploration. Seismologists use geophysics to understand plate tectonic movement, as well as predict seismic activity.
 Geochemistry is defined as the study of the processes that control the abundance, composition, and distribution of chemical compounds and isotopes in geologic environments. Geochemists use the tools and principles of chemistry to study the composition, structure, processes, and other physical aspects of the Earth. Major subdisciplines are aqueous geochemistry, cosmochemistry, isotope geochemistry and biogeochemistry.
 Soil science covers the outermost layer of the Earth's crust that is subject to soil formation processes (or pedosphere). Major subdivisions in this field of study include edaphology and pedology.
 Ecology covers the interactions between organisms and their environment. This field of study differentiates the study of Earth from the study of other planets in the Solar System, Earth being its only planet teeming with life.
 Hydrology, oceanography and limnology are studies which focus on the movement, distribution, and quality of the water and involves all the components of the hydrologic cycle on the Earth and its atmosphere (or hydrosphere). "Sub-disciplines of hydrology include hydrometeorology, surface water hydrology, hydrogeology, watershed science, forest hydrology, and water chemistry."
 Glaciology covers the icy parts of the Earth (or cryosphere).
 Atmospheric sciences cover the gaseous parts of the Earth (or atmosphere) between the surface and the exosphere (about 1000 km). Major subdisciplines include meteorology, climatology, atmospheric chemistry, and atmospheric physics.

Earth science breakup 

 Atmosphere 
 Atmospheric chemistry
 Geography
 Climatology
 Meteorology
 Hydrometeorology
 Paleoclimatology

 Biosphere 
 Biogeochemistry
 Biogeography
 Ecology
 Landscape ecology
 Geoarchaeology
 Geomicrobiology
 Paleontology
 Palynology
 Micropaleontology

 Hydrosphere 
 Hydrology
 Hydrogeology
 Limnology (freshwater science)
 Oceanography (marine science)
 Chemical oceanography
 Physical oceanography
 Biological oceanography (marine biology)
 Geological oceanography (marine geology)
 Paleoceanography

 Lithosphere (geosphere) 
 Geology
 Economic geology
 Engineering geology
 Environmental geology
 Forensic geology
 Historical geology
 Quaternary geology
 Planetary geology and planetary geography
 Sedimentology
 Stratigraphy
 Structural geology
 Geography
 Human geography
 Physical geography
 Geochemistry
 Geomorphology
 Geophysics
 Geochronology
 Geodynamics (see also Tectonics)
 Geomagnetism
 Gravimetry (also part of Geodesy)
 Seismology
 Glaciology
 Hydrogeology
 Mineralogy
 Crystallography
 Gemology
 Petrology
 Petrophysics
 Speleology
 Volcanology

 Pedosphere 
 Geography
 Soil science
 Edaphology
 Pedology

 Systems 
 Earth system science
 Environmental science
 Geography
 Human geography
 Physical geography
 Gaia hypothesis
 Systems ecology
 Systems geology

 Others 
 Geography
 Cartography
 Geoinformatics (GIScience)
 Geostatistics
 Geodesy and Surveying
 Remote Sensing
 Nanogeoscience

See also 

 American Geosciences Institute
 Earth sciences graphics software
 Glossary of geology terms
 List of Earth scientists
 List of geoscience organizations
 List of unsolved problems in geoscience
 Making North America (2015 PBS film)
 National Association of Geoscience Teachers
 Solid-earth science
 Science tourism
 Structure of the Earth

References

Sources

Further reading 

 Allaby M., 2008. Dictionary of Earth Sciences, Oxford University Press, 
 Korvin G., 1998. Fractal Models in the Earth Sciences, Elsvier, 
 
 
 
 
 Tarbuck E. J., Lutgens F. K., and Tasa D., 2002. Earth Science, Prentice Hall,

External links 

 Earth Science Picture of the Day, a service of Universities Space Research Association, sponsored by NASA Goddard Space Flight Center.
 Geoethics in Planetary and Space Exploration.
Geology Buzz: Earth Science

 

Planetary science
Science-related lists